Robert "Bob" Boyd (born November 27, 1951) is a Canadian former professional ice hockey defenceman who played in the World Hockey Association (WHA).

Career 
Boyd was drafted in the eighth round of the 1971 NHL Amateur Draft by the Detroit Red Wings. He played parts of two WHA seasons with the Minnesota Fighting Saints.

Awards and honors

References

External links

1951 births
AHCA Division I men's ice hockey All-Americans
Canadian ice hockey defencemen
Detroit Red Wings draft picks
Johnstown Jets players
Living people
Michigan State Spartans men's ice hockey players
Minnesota Fighting Saints players
Niagara Falls Flyers (1960–1972) players
Ice hockey people from Toronto
Suncoast Suns (SHL) players
Winston-Salem Polar Twins (SHL) players
Canadian expatriate ice hockey players in the United States